Joliot-Curie Metro Station is a station on the Sofia Metro in Bulgaria.  It was put into operation on 8 May 2009.

Public Transportation
 City Bus service: 413
 Suburban Bus service: 67

Location
The station is under Dragan Tsankov Boulevard at the intersection with Frederic Joliot-Curie Str. It is located next to the World Trade Center - Sofia, near the Russian Embassy.

The station serves Iztok and Izgrev residential districts and the Southern Bus Station. It is defined by a central entrance vestibule with underpass links to both sides of the boulevard and the surrounding residential areas.

The entrance vestibule and ramp of the station are covered with granite tiles and have suspended ceilings. The entire station was designed in vibrant colors: the platforms are covered with colored granite tiles and the walls have panels of circular red mosaic designs set on white tiles. The walls behind the panels are covered with a light blue mosaic.

Because of the route specifics, the station's platforms enter a maximum curve.

Gallery

References

External links
 Sofia Metropolitan
 Unofficial site

Sofia Metro stations
Railway stations opened in 2009
2009 establishments in Bulgaria